Monnow Valley Studio is a recording studio in Rockfield, Monmouthshire, Wales.

History
In the 1970s, Monnow Valley was the rehearsal facility of the famous Rockfield Studios. It became an independent studio in the 1980s owned by Charles Ward after parting from Rockfield Studios and has been used by many bands including Stereophonics, the Charlatans, Manic Street Preachers, Queen, Black Sabbath, Iggy Pop and Oasis, who used a picture of the studio interior as a cover for the single "Supersonic".

Clients

Over the last thirty years, the studio has been used by many successful artists:

Amplifier
Attack! Attack!
 Devil Sold His Soul
 Black Sabbath
 Blood Red Shoes
 Biffy Clyro
 Billy Bragg
 Bullet for My Valentine
 Busted
 Casino
 Catatonia
 The Charlatans
 The Coral
 Deadbeat Darling
 Delphic
 Devin Townsend
 The Enemy
 Feeder
 Fredrika Stahl
 Funeral for a Friend
 Future of the Left
 GLC
 Iggy Azalea
 Joss Stone
 Kaiser Chiefs
 Laura Marling
 Led Zeppelin
 Manic Street Preachers
 Marti Pellow
 Motorpsycho
 Neck Deep
 Oceansize
 Oasis
 Ozzy Osbourne
 The Pigeon Detectives
 Eugene Francis Jnr
 Robert Plant
 Iggy Pop
 Portishead
 Pulp
 Pretty Violet Stain
 Queen
 Rush
Simple Minds
 Stereophonics
 Super Furry Animals
 Sylosis
 The Stone Roses
 The View
 Tom Jones
Twin Peaks
 Yes Sir Boss

Sources

External links

Recording studios in Wales